Porrittia imbecilla is a moth of the family Pterophoridae. It is known from Egypt, Israel, Saudi Arabia and Yemen.

The larvae feed on Conyza dioscoridis.

References

Pterophorini
Lepidoptera of Egypt
Lepidoptera of Israel
Moths described in 1925
Moths of the Arabian Peninsula
Taxa named by Edward Meyrick